Nichya (Ничья in Russian Cyrillic; translates as "No one's"), is a singing, songwriting and producing duet consisting of Elena Kiper and Oleg Borschevsky. The group has released four singles, and one album to date, and has gained much popularity throughout the Russian Federation.

History
Elena Kiper became known for her songwriting talents as a songwriter for another duo, t.A.T.u. However, after breaking up with Ivan Shapovalov (t.A.T.u.'s main producer), professionally as well as privately, the only way for realizing her artistic ambitions was to start her own project.

Kiper had written one last song for t.A.T.u., however it was discarded by the group. So, she decided to record it on her own. The song is known as "Ya Ne Glotayu" and sometimes "Ty Soshel S Uma". When Kiper met up with Oleg Borschevsky, they recorded a final version of the song with new music and lyrics and titled it "Nichya", which would become the duo's name.

Nichya became a success on the internet, topping the downloading charts. The success helped them sign with Sony BMG Russia for another single. Their second single, "Nachinai Menya" (Begin With Me) was written by Oleg. The first single "Nichya" was translated and modified into an English version, released under the name "Pain to Choose". The group then released "Nikomu.Nikogda" and "Navsegda!" after releasing their full-length album titled Navsegda! in 2004.

A second album, Pora, was originally scheduled to be released in 2007. Pora would have contained the "greatest hits" from Navsegda! and a few new songs.

Discography

Singles
"Nichya"
"Nachinai Menya"
"Nikomu.Nikogda"
"Navsegda!"
"Mozhno Lyubit"

Albums
 НАВСЕГДА! (August 30, 2004)
 Pora (2007)

Russian pop music groups